The following elections occurred in the year 1837.

North America

Canada
 1837 Newfoundland general election

United States
 United States Senate election in New York, 1837

Europe

United Kingdom
 1837 United Kingdom general election

France
 1837 French legislative election

Spain
 1837 Spanish general election

See also
 :Category:1837 elections

1837
Elections